Rosenannon is a hamlet in Cornwall, England, United Kingdom.

Rosenannon Downs is a nature reserve to the north of the hamlet owned and managed by the Cornwall Wildlife Trust.

History
Although there are no listed buildings in Rosenannon village, Borlase Farmhouse and Borlase Burgess Farmhouse which are west of the village, are both Grade II listed.

References

Hamlets in Cornwall